Club Deportivo Vallobín is a Spanish football club based in Oviedo, Asturias. Founded in 1994, it plays its home games at Estadio Vallobín, in the namesake neighbourhood.

History
Despite being founded in 1994, Vallobín did not create their senior squad until 2002.

In 2019, the club achieved promotion to Tercera División for the first time ever, after only spending two seasons in the fifth tier.

Season to season

2 seasons in Tercera División

References

External links
Official website 
Profile at La Preferente 
Profile at Jugadores Segunda B 

Football clubs in Asturias
Association football clubs established in 1994
1994 establishments in Spain